Allen Maricle (born December 5, 1962) is an American politician and actor.

Maricle lived in Pioneer Village, Kentucky. He went to Sullivan Junior College and worked a communication specialist. He also worked in the television industry. He served two terms as a city councilman in Pioneer Village. He served two terms as a Republican in the Kentucky House of Representatives, from January 1995 to December 1998.

On August 10, 2022, he filed to challenge incumbent Secretary of State Michael Adams in the 2023 election.

Filmography 
 Speak and May The Plague Take You (2010)

Notes

1962 births
Living people
People from Bullitt County, Kentucky
Republican Party members of the Kentucky House of Representatives